XHADA-FM (104.1 MHz) is a radio station in Ensenada, Baja California, Mexico. It is owned by MVS Radio and carries its Exa FM format.

History
XHADA came on the air in 1991 on 106.9 MHz. Like many of MVS's Baja California stations, it was originally owned by Carlos Armando Madrazo Pintado's Sociedad Mexicana de Radio de Baja California. MVS quickly bought SOMER Baja California and later dissolved the concessionaire. The station adopted the Stereorey classic hits brand in 1999 and Best FM in 2002 before converting to Exa FM in 2003.

As part of its 2017 concession renewal, on August 27, 2018, XHADA-FM moved to 104.1 MHz, in order to clear 106-108 MHz as much as possible for community and indigenous radio stations.

References

Radio stations in Ensenada, Baja California
Radio stations established in 1991
MVS Radio